The Riseten Pass is a mountain pass of the Glarus Alps, located on the border between the Swiss cantons of St. Gallen and Glarus, at an elevation of . It crosses the col between the peaks of the Wissgandstöckli and Foostock.

See also
 List of mountain passes in Switzerland

References

External links
Risetenpass on Hikr web site

Mountain passes of Switzerland
Mountain passes of the Alps
Mountain passes of the canton of Glarus
Mountain passes of the canton of St. Gallen
Glarus–St. Gallen border